Hussain Al Quraish (born 18 December 1997) is a Saudi Arabian professional footballer who plays as a midfielder for Al-Safa.

Career
Al Quraish began his career at the youth team of Al-Safa. On 23 August 2019, Al Quraish signed a three-year contract with Al-Faisaly. On 6 October 2020, Al Quraish signed a one-year contract with Al-Nahda on loan Al-Faisaly. On 2 August 2021, Al Quraish joined former club Al-Safa on loan. On 14 June 2022, Al Quraish joined Al-Safa on a permanent deal.

References

External links 
 

1997 births
Living people
Saudi Arabian footballers
Al Safa FC players
Al-Faisaly FC players
Al-Nahda Club (Saudi Arabia) players
Saudi Fourth Division players
Saudi Professional League players
Saudi First Division League players
Saudi Second Division players
Association football midfielders
Saudi Arabian Shia Muslims